The Easter Cup is a Melbourne Racing Club Group 3 Thoroughbred open handicap horse race, over a distance of 2000 metres, held at Caulfield Racecourse, Melbourne, Australia.  Total prize money for the race is A$200,000. The race is traditionally held on Easter Saturday.

History

 1949 - 1961 was known as the Sandown Cup.

Grade

 1909–1978 - Principal Race
 1979 - Listed Race
 1980 onwards - Group 3

Distance

 1909–1911 -  miles (~2000 metres)
 1912–1913 -  miles (~2600 metres)
 1914 -  miles (~2000 metres)
 1915–1956 -  miles (~2600 metres)
 1957–1972 -  miles (~2000 metres)
 1973 onwards - 2000 metres

Winners
 
 2022 - Milford
 2021 - Hang Man
 2020 - Inverloch
 2019 - Plein Ciel 
 2018 - Shoreham 
 2017 - Observational 
 2016 - Leebaz 
 2015 - Sertorius
 2014 - Our Voodoo Prince
 2013 - Jet Away
 2012 - Folding Gear
 2011 - Paddy O'Reilly
 2010 - Fanjura
 2009 - Miss Maren
 2008 - Like It Is
 2007 - Maldivian
 2006 - Casual Pass
 2005 - Show Barry
 2004 - Tall Timbers
 2003 - Bush Padre
 2002 - Thong Classic
 2001 - Adolescence
 2000 - Litmus
 1999 - Il Don
 1998 - Vonanne
 1997 - True Identity
 1996 - Sober Suit
 1995 - Regal Half
 1994 - Idea
 1993 - Coolong Road
 1992 - Mantlepiece
 1991 - Ideal Centreman
 1990 - Lord Palmeston
 1989 - Go Timmy
 1988 - King Of Brooklyn
 1987 - Dandy Andy
 1986 - Jewel Planet
 1985 - Nearco Fair
 1984 - Pass The Baton
 1983 - Triumphal March
 1982 - Paraparap
 1981 - Amarla
 1980 - Palace Gossip
 1979 - Warri Symbol
 1978 - North Sea
 1977 - Princess Veronica
 1976 - Favoured Bay
 1975 - Bush Win
 1974 - Warm Feeling
 1973 - Adrian
 1972 - Kazanlik
 1971 - Lancelot
 1970 - Cedar King
 1969 - Future
 1968 - Yootha
 1967 - Pharaon
 1966 - Future
 1965 - Captain Blue
 1964 - Scenic's Gift
 1963 - Havelock
 1962 - Serene Princess
 1961 - Savage
 1960 - Declaree
 1959 - Webster
 1958 - Tuki
 1957 - Radiant Blue
 1956 - Oxley
 1955 - Hellion
 1954 - Te Totara
 1953 - Arabist
 1952 - Catchfree
 1951 - Prince O' Fairies6
 1950 - Plovarius
 1949 - Clement
 1948 - Promise You
 1947 - Field Balloon
 1946 - Maniototo
 1945 - Cellini
 1944 - Sir Locket
 1943 - Claudette
 1942 - Ballycummins
 1941 - Throttle
 1940 - Mac Rob
 1939 - Son Of Aurous
 1938 - Irving
 1937 - Demotic
 1936 - Red Ray
 1935 - Hot Shot
 1934 - Flail
 1933 - Flail
 1932 - Prince Dayton
 1931 - Ormolu
 1930 - Mondiaga
 1929 - Burnaby
 1928 - Sun Morn
 1927 - Buffline
 1926 - Little Millie
 1925 - Gay Serenader
 1924 - Statton
 1923 - Pendilson
 1922 - Luteplayer
 1921 - Accrington
 1920 - Mnesarchus
 1919 - Court Jester
 1918 - Ashview
 1917 - Defence
 1916 - Atora
 1915 - Meerut
 1914 - La George
 1913 - Riffian
 1912 - Avenger
 1911 - Riffian
 1910 - Imprint
 1909 - Otira

See also
 List of Australian Group races
 Group races

References

Horse races in Australia